Patricia Grace Wilson (17 December 1929 – 2005) was a British writer of 53 romance novels for the Mills & Boon publisher from 1986 to 2004. She placed her novels primarily in England, Spain or France.

Wilson died in Yorkshire in 2010.

Bibliography

Single novels

Forsythe Enchantment Saga
Forbidden Enchantment (1991)
Jungle Enchantment (1991)

Euromance or Postcards from Europe Series multi-author
Dark Sunlight (1993)
A Healing Fire (1993)

Hitched! Series multi-author
A Dangerous Magic (1993)

Today's Woman Series multi-author
Coming Home (1996)

References

External links
Harlequin Enterprises Ltd's Website

1929 births
2005 deaths
English romantic fiction writers
Women romantic fiction writers